Turkey Creek is a  stream in Malabar and Palm Bay, Florida, United States. It is a tributary of the Indian River, with its mouth in the bay of Palm Bay near Palm Bay Pointe.

See also
Indian River (Florida)
Palm Bay, Florida
Turkey Creek Sanctuary

References

Palm Bay, Florida
Rivers of Florida
Rivers of Brevard County, Florida
Tributaries of the Indian River (Florida)